Aulacophora is a genus of beetles in the family Chrysomelidae, commonly known as pumpkin beetles; some species are pests of agricultural crops. The genus was named in 1836 by the French entomologist Louis Alexandre Auguste Chevrolat, in Dejean's Catalogue des Coléoptères. The name, from Ancient Greek, signifies "furrow-bearer"' from aulax, "furrow".

Description

Distribution
Pumpkin beetles are found in Africa, Asia and Australasia. Some of the more important pest species are A. foveicollis from Africa, Europe and Asia, A. similis from southern and southeastern Asia, A. coffeae from Malaysia, A. flavomarginata from Malaysia and Indonesia, A. femoralis from Myanmar and Vietnam, A. lewisii from Malaysia and Vietnam, and A. frontalis from Singapore, Thailand, Vietnam and Laos.

Hosts
Beetles in this genus feed on members of the family Cucurbitaceae including cucumbers, pumpkins, melons, watermelons, gourds and squashes.

Life cycle
The eggs, which are yellow, are laid in batches of up to five in the soil at the base of cucurbit plants. They hatch after eight to fifteen days and the larvae feed on the roots or tunnel into them, feeding for eighteen to thirty-five days and passing through four instar stages. They are creamy white at first but have turned yellowish-orange by the time they pupate in chambers in the ground. The adult beetles emerge after from four to fourteen days. They are strong fliers and disperse to other plants. The adult beetles may live for up to ten months and each female can lay in the order of five hundred eggs, so there can be several overlapping generations of beetles.

Damage
Adult pumpkin beetles feed on the foliage and flowers of the host plants; seedlings may be destroyed by heavy attacks and young plants may be severely affected. Several beetles may cluster on a single leaf, leaving other leaves untouched. The beetles feed between the veins, often cutting and removing circular discs which they then eat. The larvae tunnel into the roots, which become swollen, discoloured and distorted, and the plant may die.

Species
The following species have been described:

 Aulacophora abdominalis (Fabricius, 1781)
 Aulacophora aculeata Weise, 1908
 Aulacophora affinis (Montrouzier, 1855)
 Aulacophora albofasciata Baly, 1886
 Aulacophora analis (Weber, 1801)
 Aulacophora ancora (Redtenbacher, 1868)
 Aulacophora andamanica Duvivier, 1885
 Aulacophora antennata Baly, 1886
 Aulacophora apicicornis (Baly, 1889)
 Aulacophora apicipennis (Jacoby, 1894)
 Aulacophora apicipes (Jacoby, 1896)
 Aulacophora apiciventris Lea, 1924
 Aulacophora approximata (Baly, 1886)
 Aulacophora arcuata Allard, 1888
 Aulacophora atripennis (Fabricius, 1801)
 Aulacophora baliensis Barroga, 2001
 Aulacophora barrogae Reid, Halling & Beatson, 2021
 Aulacophora basalis (Jacoby, 1886)
 Aulacophora batesi Jacoby, 1884
 Aulacophora bhamoensis Jacoby, 1892
 Aulacophora bhimtalensis Gangola, 1969
 Aulacophora bicincta (Montrouzier, 1855)
 Aulacophora bicolor (Weber, 1801)
 Aulacophora bipartita (Baly, 1888)
 Aulacophora biplagiata Baly, 1889
 Aulacophora bipunctata (Olivier, 1808)
 Aulacophora blackburni (Bowditch, 1914)
 Aulacophora borrei (Baly, 1889)
 Aulacophora calva Anand & Cox, 1986
 Aulacophora carinicauda Chen & Kung, 1959
 Aulacophora carteri (Guerin-Meneville, 1830)
 Aulacophora castanea Allard, 1888
 Aulacophora celebensis (Jacoby, 1886)
 Aulacophora chapuisi Duvivier, 1884
 Aulacophora chlorotica (Olivier, 1808)
 Aulacophora cincta (Fabricius, 1775)
 Aulacophora cinctipennis Duvivier, 1884
 Aulacophora circumcincta (Duvivier, 1884)
 Aulacophora circumdata Blanchard, 1853
 Aulacophora coffeae (Hornstedt, 1788)
 Aulacophora coomani Laboissiere, 1929
 Aulacophora coralinsula (Gressitt, 1955)
 Aulacophora cornuta Baly, 1879
 Aulacophora costipennis (Baly, 1886)
 Aulacophora crassicornis Medvedev, 2001
 Aulacophora cristovallensis (Montrouzier, 1855)
 Aulacophora cruenta (Fabricius, 1781)
 Aulacophora cucullata Blackburn, 1896
 Aulacophora cyanoptera (Boisduval, 1835)
 Aulacophora danumensis Mohamedsaid, 1994
 Aulacophora deplanchei (Perroud, 1864)
 Aulacophora dimidiata (Guerin-Meneville, 1830)
 Aulacophora diversa Baly, 1889
 Aulacophora doesonensis Duvivier, 1884
 Aulacophora dorsalis (Boisduval, 1835)
 Aulacophora downesi Baly, 1886
 Aulacophora duboulayi Baly, 1886
 Aulacophora excavata Baly, 1886
 Aulacophora excisa (Baly, 1886)
 Aulacophora fallax (Weise, 1923)
 Aulacophora fasciata (Allard, 1888)
 Aulacophora ficus (Montrouzier, 1855)
 Aulacophora flavicornis Chapuis, 1876
 Aulacophora flaviventris Baly, 1886
 Aulacophora flavomarginata (Duvivier, 1884)
 Aulacophora formosa Chapuis, 1879
 Aulacophora foveata (Bowditch, 1925)
 Aulacophora foveicollis (Lucas, 1849)
 Aulacophora frontalis Baly, 1888
 Aulacophora frubstorferi (Duvivier, 1891)
 Aulacophora fulvimargo (Bryant, 1936)
 Aulacophora funesta (Weise, 1892)
 Aulacophora gestroi Jacoby, 1892
 Aulacophora hayashii (Gressitt, 1955)
 Aulacophora hilaris (Boisduval, 1835)
 Aulacophora impressa (Fabricius, 1801)
 Aulacophora indica (Gmelin, 1790)
 Aulacophora insularis Jacoby, 1886
 Aulacophora ioptera (Wiedemann, 1823)
 Aulacophora irpa Mohamedsaid, 1994
 Aulacophora jacobyi (Weise, 1924)
 Aulacophora kampeni (Weise, 1917)
 Aulacophora kinabaluensis Mohamedsaid, 1994
 Aulacophora kotoensis Chujo, 1962
 Aulacophora laevifrons (Baly, 1888)
 Aulacophora laysi Medvedev, 2001
 Aulacophora leopoldi Laboissiere, 1934
 Aulacophora lewisii Baly, 1886
 Aulacophora limbata (Illiger, 1800)
 Aulacophora loochooensis Chujo, 1957
 Aulacophora loriana Jacoby, 1904
 Aulacophora luteicornis (Fabricius, 1801)
 Aulacophora macropus (Montrouzier, 1855)
 Aulacophora marginalis (Chapuis, 1876)
 Aulacophora marginata Chapuis, 1876
 Aulacophora mariana (Chujo, 1943)
 Aulacophora martia (Weise, 1922)
 Aulacophora mbabaram Reid, Halling & Beatson, 2021
 Aulacophora medioflava Lea, 1924
 Aulacophora medvedevi Samoderzhenkov, 1992
 Aulacophora melanocephala Jacoby, 1892
 Aulacophora melanoptera (Boisduval, 1835)
 Aulacophora melanopus (Blanchard, 1853)
 Aulacophora melanura (Olivier, 1808)
 Aulacophora militaris Jacoby, 1894
 Aulacophora mimica Medvedev, 2001
 Aulacophora mjoebergi (Weise, 1916)
 Aulacophora moluccaensis (Laboissiere, 1932)
 Aulacophora montrouzieri (Fairmaire, 1883)
 Aulacophora mouhoti Baly, 1886
 Aulacophora naseemi Abdullah & Qureshi, 1968
 Aulacophora nigripennis Motschulsky, 1857
 Aulacophora nigrobrunnea (Maulik, 1929)
 Aulacophora nigropalgiata Jacoby, 1894
 Aulacophora nigrosignata (Baly, 1886)
 Aulacophora nilgiriensis Jacoby, 1903
 Aulacophora notulata (Fairmaire, 1850)
 Aulacophora nstabilis (Baly, 1886)
 Aulacophora nusantara Barroga, 2001
 Aulacophora oblonga (Gyllenhal, 1808)
 Aulacophora occipitalis (Baly, 1888)
 Aulacophora olivieri (Baly, 1888)
 Aulacophora opacipennis Chujo, 1962
 Aulacophora orientalis (Hornstedt, 1788)
 Aulacophora pahangi Mohamedsaid, 1994
 Aulacophora palliata (Schaller, 1783)
 Aulacophora pallidofasciata Jacoby, 1904
 Aulacophora pannonica Csiki, 1953
 Aulacophora papuana Jacoby, 1894
 Aulacophora parambikulamensis Maulik, 1936
 Aulacophora perroudi (Baly, 1888)
 Aulacophora plicaticollis (Allard, 1888)
 Aulacophora postica (Chapuis, 1876)
 Aulacophora posticalis (Guerin-Meneville, 1830)
 Aulacophora propinqua (Baly, 1886)
 Aulacophora pulchella Baly, 1879
 Aulacophora pygidialis (Baly, 1886)
 Aulacophora quadrimaculata (Fabricius, 1781)
 Aulacophora quadrinotata Chapuis, 1876
 Aulacophora quadripartia (Fairmaire, 1877)
 Aulacophora quadrispilota Fabricius, 1781
 Aulacophora quinqueplagiata (Duvivier, 1891)
 Aulacophora relicta (Boisduval, 1835)
 Aulacophora rigoensis Jacoby, 1904
 Aulacophora robusticornis Medvedev, 2001
 Aulacophora rosea (Fabricius, 1801)
 Aulacophora rubrontata Blanchard, 1853
 Aulacophora semilimbata Baly, 1886
 Aulacophora serena (Weise, 1923)
 Aulacophora signata Kirsch, 1866
 Aulacophora signata Kirsch, 1866
 Aulacophora smaragdipennis Duvivier, 1884
 Aulacophora sordidula (Weise, 1922)
 Aulacophora subcaerulea Jacoby, 1894
 Aulacophora tetraspilota (Baly, 1886)
 Aulacophora tibialis Chapuis, 1876
 Aulacophora transversa Allard, 1888
 Aulacophora tricolora (Weise, 1892)
 Aulacophora tristis Medvedev, 2001
 Aulacophora unicolor (Jacoby, 1883)
 Aulacophora varians Chapuis, 1876
 Aulacophora vicina (Boisduval, 1835)
 Aulacophora vietnamica Medvedev, 2001
 Aulacophora viridis Maulik, 1936
 Aulacophora vittula (Chapuis, 1876)
 Aulacophora wallacii Baly, 1886
 Aulacophora wilsoni Baly, 1888
 Aulacophora yunnanensis Chen & Kung, 1959

The following poorly described species are considered nomina dubia:
 Aulacophora artensis (Montrouzier, 1861) (from New Caledonia, possibly synonym of Aulacophora abdominalis (Fabricius, 1781) or Aulacophora deplanchei (Perroud, 1864), type material probably lost)
 Aulacophora flavescens (Montrouzier, 1855) (from both Woodlark Island and San Cristoval Island, possibly a species of the Aulacophora indica species complex)
 Aulacophora flaviola (Boisduval, 1835) (from New Guinea, not identifiable to genus)
 Aulacophora punctata (Boisduval, 1835) (from New Guinea, not identifiable to genus)
 Aulacophora scutellata (Boisduval, 1835) (from the "Pacific Ocean", possibly a synonym of Candezea palustris (Perroud & Montrouzier, 1864))

The following are now synonyms of other species:
 Aulacophora almora Maulik, 1936: synonym of Aulacophora tibialis Chapuis, 1876
 Aulacophora argyrogaster (Montrouzier, 1861): synonym of Aulacophora abdominalis (Fabricius, 1781)
 Aulacophora armigera Baly, 1889: synonym of Aulacophora abdominalis (Fabricius, 1781)
 Aulacophora aruensis (Weise, 1892): synonym of Aulacophora abdominalis (Fabricius, 1781)
 Aulacophora ceramensis (Weise, 1892): synonym of Aulacophora indica (Gmelin, 1790)
 Aulacophora dohrni (Jacoby, 1899): synonym of Aulacophora tibialis Chapuis, 1876
 Aulacophora duvivieri Baly, 1886: synonym of Aulacophora cornuta Baly, 1879
 Aulacophora fabricii Baly, 1886: synonym of Aulacophora abdominalis (Fabricius, 1781)
 Aulacophora femoralis (Motschulsky, 1857): synonym of Aulacophora indica (Gmelin, 1790)
 Aulacophora flavipes (Jacoby, 1888): synonym of Aulacophora indica (Gmelin, 1790)
 Aulacophora niasiensis (Weise, 1892): synonym of Aulacophora indica (Gmelin, 1790)
 Aulacophora nigripalpis Chen & Kung, 1959: synonym of Aulacophora apicipes (Jacoby, 1896)
 Aulacophora quadraria (Olivier, 1808): synonym of Aulacophora analis (Weber, 1801)
 Aulacophora ritsemae Duvivier, 1884: synonym of Aulacophora tibialis Chapuis, 1876
 Aulacophora robusta Duvivier, 1884: synonym of Aulacophora cornuta Baly, 1879
 Aulacophora semifusca Jacoby, 1892: synonym of Aulacophora tibialis Chapuis, 1876
 Aulacophora similis (Olivier, 1808): synonym of Aulacophora indica (Gmelin, 1790)
 Aulacophora tenuicincta (Jacoby, 1897): synonym of Aulacophora apicipes (Jacoby, 1896)
 Aulacophora terminata (Jacoby, 1899): synonym of Aulacophora tibialis Chapuis, 1876

References

 
Agricultural pest insects
Chrysomelidae genera
Taxa named by Louis Alexandre Auguste Chevrolat